On 24 July 1987, Air Afrique Flight 056, a McDonnell Douglas DC-10-30 operating the Brazzaville–Bangui–Rome–Paris service was hijacked and diverted to Geneva Airport. One passenger was killed and 30 people were injured.

Background 
The hijacker was 21-year-old Hussein Hariri, a Lebanese Shiite who claimed to be a member of the Popular Front for the Liberation of Palestine (PFLP). He carried a pistol and an explosives belt containing TNT. Flight 056 was operated by a McDonnell Douglas DC-10-30 with registration TU-TAL.

Hijacking 
Hariri hijacked the flight after it departed Rome-Fiumicino International Airport and demanded the captain to fly the aircraft to Beirut International Airport in Lebanon. However, the captain, Eduard Artisu, responded that there was insufficient fuel for the aircraft to reach Beirut without a refueling stop and offered to land in Geneva, Switzerland, for refueling. Hariri accepted the offer.

Raid 
After the plane landed in Geneva at 8:08 AM, Hariri demanded the release of two of his brothers, who were prisoners in West Germany and threatened to kill passengers if his demands were not met. Two hours later, Hariri shot and killed a 28-year-old French passenger. Four hours after landing, passengers opened the emergency exits and began to evacuate the aircraft via the evacuation slides. One flight attendant attempted to overpower Hariri but was shot and injured. 29 people received injuries during the evacuation. The Swiss police then raided the aircraft. The operation lasted eight minutes, while the entire hijacking had lasted nearly four hours.

Aftermath

Trial 
Two years after the hijacking, Hussein Hariri was tried at the Federal Supreme Court of Switzerland in Lausanne for hijacking, murder, and attempted murder. He was convicted and sentenced to life imprisonment. 

In 2002, he escaped from prison and spent three months on the run. At the time, he had been allowed weekend furloughs from prison, in preparation for his release on parole in 2004.

Hariri was released in 2004 and deported to Lebanon.

Further history of the aircraft 
The aircraft was damaged during the raid but was repaired and returned to service with Air Afrique. It was transferred to AOM French Airlines in 1996 and re-registered as F-GTDI. On 21 December 1999, while being leased to Cubana de Aviación, the aircraft crashed in Guatemala as Flight 1216, killing 16 of the 314 people on board and two more on the ground.

References 

July 1987 events
Accidents and incidents involving the McDonnell Douglas DC-10
Aviation accidents and incidents in Switzerland
Aviation accidents and incidents in 1987
1987 in Switzerland
Aircraft hijackings